Alarm in Morocco (French: Alerte au sud, Italian:  Allarme a sud) is a 1953 French-Italian adventure film directed by Jean-Devaivre and starring Jean-Claude Pascal, Gianna Maria Canale and Erich von Stroheim. Partly shot on location in Morocco, it was made using the Gevacolor process.

Plot
In the south of French Morocco, two members of the Foreign Legion uncover what they believe to be the testing of a secret weapon.

Cast
 Jean-Claude Pascal as Jean Pasqier  
 Gianna Maria Canale as Nathalie Provence  
 Erich von Stroheim as Conrad Nagel  
 Jean Tissier as Guillaume Provence  
 Albert Dinan as Roland 
 Peter van Eyck as Howard  
 Daniel Sorano as Serge Depoigny  
 Lia Amanda as Michèle  
 Jean Murat as Le Colonel  
 Daniel Lecourtois as Le commandant  
 Simone Bach as Solange  
  as Le commissaire  
 Thomy Bourdelle as Berthier  
 Antoine Balpêtré as Le juge 
 Marcel Pérès as Le général  
  as La petite rousse  
 Dario Michaelis as Le balafré  
 Gérard Buhr as Bernis  
  
 François Joux

References

Bibliography 
 Arthur Lennig. Stroheim. University Press of Kentucky, 2004.

External links 
 

1953 films
French adventure thriller films
1950s adventure thriller films
1950s French-language films
Films directed by Jean Devaivre
Films shot in Morocco
Films set in Morocco
Italian adventure thriller films
Films about the French Foreign Legion
Films scored by Joseph Kosma
1950s French films
1950s Italian films